The Pralboino Altarpiece is a 1540–1545 oil on canvas painting by Moretto da Brescia in the church of Sant'Andrea in Pralboino, Province of Brescia, Italy.  The work's upper register shows the Madonna and Child with Francis of Assisi and Saint Joseph, whilst below (from left to right) are saints Jerome, Louis of Toulouse, Anthony of Padua, Clare of Assisi and the painting's commissioner, cardinal Uberto Gambara, member of a local family. It was originally in the same town's Franciscan church of Santa Maria degli Angeli.

It was first recorded in the 17th century by Francesco Paglia, who described it after mentioning his Madonna and Child with Saint Roch and Saint Sebastian in the church of San Rocco, now in the parish church. It was probably moved to its present location after the first suppression of the Franciscans on 30 September 1797 - it was certainly there by 1858, when an engraving of the painting referred to it being in Sant'Andrea, as did Stefano Fenaroli's 1875 guidebook.

References

Bibliography (in Italian)
Pietro Da Ponte, L'opera del Moretto, Brescia 1898
Stefano Fenaroli, Alessandro Bonvicino soprannominato il Moretto pittore bresciano. Memoria letta all'Ateneo di Brescia il giorno 27 luglio 1873, Brescia 1875
György Gombosi, Moretto da Brescia, Basel 1943
Mina Gregori, G. B. Moroni in I pittori bergamaschi dal XIII al XIX secolo - Il Cinquecento, Bergamo 1979
Francesco Paglia, Il Giardino della Pittura, Brescia 1675
Gaetano Panazza, Camillo Boselli, Pitture in Brescia dal Duecento all'Ottocento, exhibition catalogue, Brescia 1946
Pier Virgilio Begni Redona, Alessandro Bonvicino – Il Moretto da Brescia, Editrice La Scuola, Brescia 1988

1545 paintings
Paintings by Moretto da Brescia
Paintings in the Province of Brescia
Paintings of the Madonna and Child
Paintings of Saint Joseph
Paintings of Francis of Assisi
Paintings of Jerome
Paintings of Anthony of Padua
Paintings of Louis of Toulouse
Paintings of Clare of Assisi
Altarpieces